Luxury Racing is a motor racing team from France that formed in 2009. The team specialises in endurance racing, more specifically the FIA World Endurance Championship and has solely used Ferraris since 2011.

History

2011

The team had its first venture in the 24 Hours of Le Mans in 2011, where they raced two cars in the LMGTE Pro class. They qualified 36th and 41st, which is 8th and 13th in their class with the #59 and #58 cars respectively.

Unfortunately, both cars didn't finish the race, with the #58 car managing only 136 laps, and the #59 car lasting a further 47 with 183 laps.

2012
For the 2012 24 Hours of Le Mans, the team qualified first in the LMGTE Pro class with the #59 car, which was 34th overall and just under five tenths of a second faster than the nearest competitor while the #58 car in the LMGTE Am class qualified in 44th, one place ahead of one of the LMP2 cars.

During the race, the #58 car retired after 146 laps, while the #59 car went on to complete 333 laps and finish the race in 18th, which was 2nd in their class after losing out to the winner by 3 laps. This also marked the team's first finish in the event since its debut in 2011.

Race Summary

* Season still in progress.

Complete 24 Hours of Le Mans results

External links

Racing results 2010–2012

European Le Mans Series teams
24 Hours of Le Mans teams
American Le Mans Series teams
FIA Sportscar Championship entrants
FIA World Endurance Championship teams
International GT Open teams
French auto racing teams
Auto racing teams established in 2009